The Asian Touring Car Series (ATCS) is a touring car racing series that takes place each year across several Asian nations. It includes events at circuits in Malaysia, China and Indonesia. It ran as the Asian Touring Car Championship (ATCC) between 2000-2001, and 2005-2006.

The championship consists of three classes. Division 1 uses cars built to Super 2000 or BTC Touring regulations. Proton provides the only factory team, whose main opposition is the independent German BMW team of Engstler Motorsport. Division 2 uses Super Production regulations for cars with engine capacities of not more than 2000cc. Engstler Motorsport has a single entry in this class and is the main competition to the four-car line-up of DTM Bel’Air Racing from Hong Kong. Division 3 is a 1600cc class and is the most production-based of the three. Only DTM Bel’Air Racing fielded entries in this class during 2006.

2000 Super Production Era
In 2000, the ATCC moved from Super Touring to Super Production regulations. Reigning champion Charles Kwan, with his teammate Paul Chan and EKS Motorsports entered two BMW 320i to defend his title. Rival Henry Lee Junior joined WK Longman Racing to fight for the championship. Charles famously won the race at Shah Alam from the very back of the grid that year, but his car broke down in Zhuhai and Macau, allowing Henry Lee Junior to win.

In 2001, Charles Kwan moved with EKS Motorsport to race in the JGTC. WKS Longman Racing entered Thai driver Nattavude Charoensukhawatana in the championship and he won the title almost unopposed. The only serious rival he had was Chen Jun-San's Toyota Altezza of AAI Motorsports from Taiwan.

Champions

See also
 TCR Asia Series

References

External links

Touring car racing series
Touring Car Championship, Asian